Alliyambal was an Indian Malayalam language romantic soap opera television show aired on Zee Keralam TV channel and digitally on ZEE5 platform. It is an official remake of Marathi television show Tujhyat Jeev Rangala.

South Indian actors Jai Dhanush and Pallavi Gowda plays the lead roles marking their debut in Malayalam Television. The channel has announced the second part due to its high viewership. Teams are planning for sequel. It is dubbed into Telugu as Fida.

Plot
The show story of is the love story of landlord and wrestler Devan and highly educated school teacher Alli who has recently moved to the village. Their difference in mindset, upbringing and lifestyle makes their love story sweet and complicated at the same time.

Cast
Lead Cast
Pallavi Gowda as Alli 
Jai Dhanush  as Devan/Devabhadran
Keerthi Jai Dhanush as Archa Vishnubhadran
Jayan as Veerabhadran, Devan and Vishnu's father
Abhinay Shiju as Manikuttan
 Recurring Cast

Benny John as Chinnan
Thrissur Elsy as Ayamma
Ibrahim kutty as Viswanathan
Midhula as Pavithra
Akhil Anand as Vishnubhadran
Shanavas Shanu as Sreeram
__ as Revamma
Manju Vineesh as Ganga
Jaseela Parveen as Mythili
Bindu Ramakrishnan as Nagamaniyamma
Sadhika Venugopal as Devan's mother
Ameya Nair as Shalini
__ as Prabhakaran
__ as Vavachan 
Thirumala Ramachandran
Architha
Dini Daniel

Adaptations

References

External links 

 Alliyambal at ZEE5
 

Zee Keralam original programming
Malayalam-language television shows